The Man Who Lost His Head is a 2-hour comedy drama written by Mark Wallington and starring Martin Clunes about the theme of cultural repatriation. It was a joint production of TVNZ in New Zealand and ITV in the United Kingdom.

Broadcast
The film was first broadcast on Sunday 26 August 2007 at 9 pm on ITV1 in Britain and 8:30 pm on TV ONE in New Zealand.

Production
The film was shot entirely on location in New Zealand. The action took place in the fictional town of Otakataka but was in fact mostly filmed on the West Coast of the North Island, around Huia and Bethells Beach.

References

External links
 

Art and cultural repatriation
2007 television films
2007 films
British television films
Films set in New Zealand
Films shot in New Zealand
Works about Māori people
Television series by South Pacific Pictures
Television series by All3Media
TVNZ 1 original programming